"Peak Performance" is the twenty-first and penultimate episode of the second season of the American science fiction television series Star Trek: The Next Generation, the 47th episode overall, first broadcast on July 10, 1989.

Set in the 24th century, the series follows the adventures of the Starfleet crew of the Federation starship Enterprise-D. In this episode, while in the midst of a war-game exercise, a Ferengi marauder intrudes.

Plot
The Enterprise, under the command of Captain Jean-Luc Picard, is ordered by Starfleet Command to take part in simulated combat exercises to prepare for the Borg threat. A renowned Zakdorn strategist named Sirna Kolrami (Roy Brocksmith) is sent to serve as observer and mediator of the exercise. Commander Riker challenges Kolrami to a game of Strategema, knowing he has no chance to win, just for the honor of playing a grandmaster. Doctor Pulaski pushes Data to challenge the arrogant Kolrami, assuming Kolrami will be no match for Data's android reflexes and computational ability. When the two later play, Data is also soundly beaten, causing him to become convinced he is malfunctioning and remove himself from duty.

The combat exercise pits the Enterprise against an 80-year-old retired Federation ship U.S.S. Hathaway, which is in orbit around a nearby planet. Picard is to command the Enterprise, while Riker is to choose a crew for the Hathaway. Riker recruits Chief Engineer Geordi La Forge, Lt. Worf and Acting Ensign Wesley Crusher as his senior staff, and the team begins their efforts to restore the old ship to working order. The Hathaway is easily outclassed by the Enterprise, and has no antimatter, making warp speed impossible. Wesley, returns to the Enterprise under false pretenses and surreptitiously beams a school experiment containing a small amount of antimatter to the Hathaway, which would allow them a very short warp burst, though they are uncertain it will work.

Pulaski and Troi are unable to persuade Data that he is not malfunctioning, but Picard reminds him of his duty, and advises him "It is possible to commit no mistakes and still lose. That is not a weakness; that is life." Data's confidence is restored, and he returns to the bridge.

As the battle begins, Worf accesses the Enterprises sensors, generating a fake image of a Romulan warship attacking, and while the Enterprise is distracted, the Hathaway scores the first hits. Kolrami, who was initially dismissive of Riker's ability, is impressed. The Enterprise regroups and prepares to attack the Hathaway when sensors report another intruding ship – a Ferengi marauder. Picard realizes too late that this ship is not a sensor trick, and the Ferengi attack leaves the Enterprises phasers locked in simulation mode and unable to return fire.

The Ferengi commander, DaiMon Bractor (Armin Shimerman), is unaware of the wargames and suspicious of the behavior of the two Federation ships, concluding the Hathaway must be valuable, and demands that Picard surrender it to him. Picard and Riker devise a risky plan, where the Enterprise fires photon torpedoes at the Hathaway, with the Hathaway using their short warp burst to jump to safety an instant before the torpedoes detonate. The Ferengi, believing their prize has been destroyed, turn their attention to the Enterprise, but Worf tricks their sensors into detecting another Federation ship approaching, and the Ferengi flee.

With the wargames over, Data challenges Kolrami to a Strategema rematch. This time, Data is able to hold Kolrami in check; Kolrami grows more and more frustrated as the match progresses, ultimately throwing down his controls in disgust and storming off. Data explains that he altered his strategy, giving up opportunities for advancement in order to maintain a stalemate, which he believes he could have maintained indefinitely. He initially regards the result as a draw, but after prodding from Pulaski, admits his success.

Production 
This episode is noted for featuring special effect sequences with a Constellation-class starship in outer space. This design was used previously on the show in the first-season  episode "The Battle" and appears in several other episodes.

Reception
At its original broadcast, the episode was seen by 9.4% of American households, as estimated by the episode's Nielsen Rating.

Zack Handlen of The A.V. Club gave the episode a B+, calling it a "solid entry" that allows "nearly every major character a moment to shine."
Keith R.A. DeCandido of Tor.com rated the episode 7 out of 10.

In June 2019, ScreenRant rated "Peak Performance" the 8th best episode of all Star Trek up to that time. ScreenRant points out that Riker is in command of a decades-old spacecraft called the Hathaway and must face off against Captain Picard in the Enterprise 1701D, with one of the themes being leadership. They note it has a famous Captain Picard line, "It is possible to commit no mistakes and still lose."
In 2020, ScreenRant ranked "Peak Performance" again, this time the 13th best episode of all Star Trek franchise television episodes.

References

 Star Trek The Next Generation DVD set, volume 2, disc 6, selection 1.

External links

 

Star Trek: The Next Generation (season 2) episodes
1989 American television episodes
Television episode directed by Robert Scheerer